Azusa (Tongva: Asuksa-nga) is a city in the San Gabriel Valley region of Los Angeles County, California, United States at the foot of the San Gabriel Mountains located 20 miles east of downtown Los Angeles.

Its population was 50,000 in 2020, an  increase from 46,361 at the 2010 census. Azusa is located along historic Route 66, which passes through the city on Foothill Boulevard and Alosta Avenue.

Azusa is bordered by the San Gabriel Mountains range to the north, Irwindale to the west, the unincorporated community of Vincent to the southwest, Glendora and the unincorporated community of Citrus to the east, and Covina to the south.

History 
The place name Azusa dates to the Mexican Alta California era in the 19th century when Azusa was used to refer to the San Gabriel Valley and the San Gabriel River. It appears to have been derived from the Tongva place name Asuksa-nga.
The area was part of the homeland of the indigenous Tongva people (Gabrieleño Indians) since at least 55 BC. A backronym, "Azusa stands for everything from A to Z in the U.S.A.", has been a phrase used to promote the city by organisations such as the Chamber of Commerce for many years.

The first Mexican settlement in Azusa was at the Rancho el Susa in 1841, a Mexican land grant from the Alta California Governor Juan Bautista Alvarado to Luis Arenas. In 1844, Arenas sold the rancho's land to Henry Dalton, an English immigrant and wealthy merchant from the Pueblo of Los Angeles, for $7,000. He renamed it Rancho Azusa de Dalton, and had built a winery, distillery, vinegar house, meat smokehouse, and flour mill. Also, a vineyard was planted. Dalton built a house here on a place known as Dalton Hill, near 6th Street and Cerritos Avenue in Azusa.

Dalton was also the owner of the large, adjacent Rancho San Francisquito and Rancho Santa Anita properties. In the end, Dalton owned an unbroken expanse of land from present-day San Dimas to the eastern edge of Pasadena. A portion of Azusa west of the San Gabriel River was within adjacent Rancho Azusa de Duarte.

With the cession of California to the United States following the Mexican–American War, the 1848 Treaty of Guadalupe Hidalgo provided that the land grants would be honored. As required by the Land Act of 1851, a claim for Rancho San Francisquito was filed with the Public Land Commission in 1852 and confirmed by the Commission in 1853, but rejected by the US District Court in 1855, on the grounds that Henry Dalton was not, at the time of the grant, a citizen of Mexico.  The decree was reversed by the US Supreme Court,  and the grant was patented to Henry Dalton in 1867.

Azusa was listed in the 1860 census as a township (encompassing the Azusa de Dalton and Azusa de Duarte ranchos) with a population of 363. The 1870 US Census listed the area as the township of Azusa – El Monte Township and 1880 US Census listed the area as the township of San Jose and Azusa. There were a few corrections to cross out the San Jose name on most of the census pages, but this was done sporadically and there remain many index errors in the online census due to these errors.

Dalton had borrowed money from Los Angeles banker Jonathan S. Slauson to fund 24 years of litigation, and had to sign the land over to him in 1880. Slauson laid out the plan for the city in 1887 and the city was officially incorporated in 1898.

The completion of the Los Angeles and San Gabriel Valley Railroad in January 1887, later sold to the Santa Fe railroad, brought new people looking for homes and investment opportunities in Azusa. The Gold Line Foothill light rail line is being built on the old rail right-of-way. Part of this land boom was the short-lived town of Gladstone in 1887, which merged into Azusa in 1905.

Geography 
The city is located at the entrance to the San Gabriel Canyon, giving the city its nickname "The Canyon City." It is on the east side of the San Gabriel River.

Sister cities
Azusa has one sister city:
 Zacatecas, State of Zacatecas, Mexico

Climate
This region experiences warm, dry summers, with no average monthly temperatures above . According to the Köppen Climate Classification system, Azusa has a warm-summer Mediterranean climate, abbreviated "Csb" on climate maps.

Demographics

2010
The 2010 United States Census reported that Azusa had a population of 46,361. The racial makeup of Azusa was 26,715 (57.6%) White (19.3% Non-Hispanic White),  1,499 (3.2%) African American, 562 (1.2%) Native American, 4,054 (8.7%) Asian, 87 (0.2%) Pacific Islander, 11,270 (24.3%) from other races, and 2,174 (4.7%) from two or more races. There were 31,328 people of Hispanic or Latino origin, of any race (67.6%).

The Census reported that 43,559 people (94.0% of the population) lived in households, 2,691 (5.8%) lived in non-institutionalized group quarters, and 111 (0.2%) were institutionalized.

There were 12,716 households, out of which 5,955 (46.8%) had children under the age of 18 living in them, 6,310 (49.6%) were opposite-sex married couples living together, 2,275 (17.9%) had a female householder with no husband present, 1,014 (8.0%) had a male householder with no wife present.  There were 891 (7.0%) unmarried opposite-sex partnerships, and 104 (0.8%) same-sex married couples or partnerships. 2,238 households (17.6%) were made up of individuals, and 761 (6.0%) had someone living alone who was 65 years of age or older. The average household size was 3.43.  There were 9,599 families (75.5% of all households); the average family size was 3.85.

The population was spread out, with 12,407 people (26.8%) under the age of 18, 7,724 people (16.7%) aged 18 to 24, 13,185 people (28.4%) aged 25 to 44, 9,469 people (20.4%) aged 45 to 64, and 3,576 people (7.7%) who were 65 years of age or older.  The median age was 29.3 years. For every 100 females, there were 96.0 males.  For every 100 females age 18 and over, there were 92.8 males.

The homeowner vacancy rate was 1.4%; the rental vacancy rate was 6.6%.  22,805 people (49.2% of the population) lived in owner-occupied housing units and 20,754 people (44.8%) lived in rental housing units.

During 2009–2013, Azusa had a median household income of $52,001, with 20.1% of the population living below the federal poverty line.

2000
As of the census of 2000, there were 44,712 people, 12,549 households, and 9,298 families residing in the city. The population density was 5,023.7 inhabitants per square mile (1,939.7/km2). The racial makeup of the city was 52.35% White, 3.78% Black or African American, 1.31% Native American, 6.14% Asian, 0.17% Pacific Islander, 30.52% from other races, and 5.73% from two or more races.  63.79% of the population were Hispanic or Latino of any race.

There were 12,549 households, out of which 43.5% had children under the age of 18 living with them, 49.7% were married couples living together, 17.1% had a female householder with no husband present, and 25.9% were non-families. 18.7% of all households were made up of individuals, and 6.2% had someone living alone who was 65 years of age or older.  The average household size was 3.41 and the average family size was 3.90.

In the city, the population was spread out, with 30.8% under the age of 18, 15.5% from 18 to 24, 31.5% from 25 to 44, 15.3% from 45 to 64, and 6.9% who were 65 years of age or older.  The median age was 27 years. For every 100 females, there were 97.5 males.  For every 100 females age 18 and over, there were 93.6 males.

The median income for a household in the city was $39,191, and the median income for a family was $40,918. Males had a median income of $30,845 versus $26,565 for females. The per capita income for the city was $13,412.  About 15.1% of families and 18.8% of the population were below the poverty line, including 23.9% of those under age 18 and 10.4% of those age 65 or over.

Economy
According to the City of Azusa's FY 2014-15 Comprehensive Annual Financial Report - Please refer to reference 29 below for link, the top employers in the city are:

Azusa was the former home of the Lucky Lager brewery and its successor, General Brewing. Built in 1949, the facility was purchased and converted to production by Miller Brewery in May 1966. A decade later, Miller relocated its operations to the nearby city of Irwindale and the Azusa facility ceased production in 1980, eventually being demolished.

Professional sports teams

Superfund site
Aerojet, the rocket engine manufacturer, had a plant in Azusa from World War II to 2001. In 1980, it was determined that under Aerojet's facility there was TCE water contamination in the groundwater, whose plume was entering the aquifer under the city and of the San Gabriel Valley groundwater basin.  The San Gabriel Valley aquifer is very valuable, providing most of the drinking water in the area at a fraction of the cost of water imported by aqueducts. In 1985, the U.S. EPA declared it a Superfund Site.

In 1997, additional chemical contamination, mostly NDMA and ammonium perchlorate, was found in the site's groundwater.  Aerojet was named the Responsible Party for the groundwater remediation (cleanup) work and expenses. Aerojet sold the property in 2001 to Northrop Grumman Corporation, but remained the Responsible Party for the pollution.

In a 2002 court decision,  Aerojet and seven other San Gabriel Valley groundwater polluters agreed to provide funding to build and operate six water-treatment facilities. One of the main contaminants is perchlorate, a carcinogenic component of rocket fuels produced by Aerojet.

Government and infrastructure 
Azusa's City Council elections were held on a Tuesday after the first Monday in March in odd-numbered years until the 2017 election. Effective with the 2020 California Primary election, it will be held on a Tuesday after the first Monday in March of even-numbered years. The Mayor is elected to a two-year term, City Council members are elected to a four-year term and elected at-large.

The city mayor is Robert Gonzales.
On March 9, 2011, Azusa voters approved an agreement between Azusa Rock, Inc. and the city to address environmental issues associated with hillside mining in the area. The benefits of the proposed agreement has been questioned by several groups.

The Los Angeles County Department of Health Services operates the Monrovia Health Center in Monrovia, serving Azusa.

Education 
Public schools
Azusa is served by the Azusa Unified School District. Its schools include:
 Eleven traditional elementary schools: Dalton, Ellington, Gladstone Street, Hodge, Lee, Magnolia, Mountain View, Murray, Paramount, Powell, and Valleydale
 Three intermediate schools: Center, Foothill, and Slauson
 One Kindergarten-only elementary school: Longfellow
 One elementary-intermediate combo school (grades K-8): Ellington (traditional elementary school) will become a combo in 2015–2016.
 Azusa High School
 Gladstone High School (California)
 Sierra (Continuation) High School — a model continuation school
 Azusa Adult School

Private schools
St. Frances of Rome Elementary School (grades k-8) — part of St. Frances of Rome Catholic Church, in the Los Angeles Archdiocese.
Azusa Pacific University — a private Christian university and 
Dhammakaya Open University — a private Buddhist university.

Transportation 
Azusa lies along the Foothill Freeway (I-210) between the San Gabriel River Freeway (I-605) and the Orange Freeway (State Route 57). Azusa Avenue (State Route 39) extends from the Angeles National Forest starting at San Gabriel Canyon Road/Sierra Madre Avenue south through Orange County.

Metro Gold Line light rail service stops at Azusa Downtown station adjacent to Azusa city hall and the line terminates at Azusa Pacific University/Citrus College station at the eastern border of Downtown Azusa. On March 5, 2016, Azusa became the eastern terminus of the first phase of the Foothill Extension which previously operated between Los Angeles Union Station and Sierra Madre Villa station in eastern Pasadena.

The Gold Line operates along former Atchison, Topeka & Santa Fe Railway right-of-way purchased by the Metropolitan Transportation Authority in 1993. MTA is currently pre-constructing and planning to extend the line to the end of its reserved right-of-way in Montclair, just across the San Bernardino County line. In October 2009, the MTA Board unanimously voted to include the Foothill Extension in its long-range plan, and approved funding for the construction and operation of the Foothill Extension's first phase to Azusa. This phase of the extension broke ground in June 2010.

The Metrolink San Bernardino Line stops nearby at Covina station and Baldwin Park station several times each day.

Principal streets
Azusa's main arterial streets are:
Azusa Avenue (State Route 39) — begins in the Angeles National Forest, proceeds down from the San Gabriel Mountains and south crossing the Foothill Freeway (I-210) and I-10, and continues through Orange County to the Pacific Coast Highway.
Foothill Boulevard — this section begins at the San Gabriel River crossing into Irwindale, and enters Azusa, passes Azusa Pacific University, and jogs north at Citrus Avenue. Continuing straight past Citrus, the street becomes Alosta Avenue, where at Amelia Avenue, it turns back into Foothill Boulevard. Irwindale and turns into Alosta Avenue and travels in front of Azusa Pacific University. The Azusa section of Foothill Boulevard was on historic U.S. Route 66.
 San Gabriel Avenue — begins at Sierra Madre Avenue, and travels south, connecting into Azusa Avenue. San Gabriel Avenue is used for the annual Azusa Golden Days Parade.

In popular culture
A popular running gag on the long-running radio comedy The Jack Benny Program involved a character voiced by Mel Blanc announcing the arrival or departure of a train to or from "Anaheim, Azusa, and Cuc-a-monga," all three then being small towns without rail service at the time.

Azusa boasted the world's first Go Kart factory as of 1958.  The product proved very popular.  Go Kart went into bankruptcy in 1963.

The city's name appeared in the title of the Jan and Dean song "Anaheim, Azusa, & Cucamonga Sewing Circle, Book Review and Timing Association" in 1964.

In 1971 Life magazine ran a cover story on teen pregnancy featuring a unique program for pregnant high school teens. The story focused on teenage mothers attending Citrus High School in Azusa. At a time when many pregnant teens were shunned by their schools and families, Citrus High School sought to help the teen mothers continue their studies while pregnant.

In Hold Back the Dawn (1941), Emmy Brown (Olivia de Havilland), a schoolmarm from Azusa, recites the claim that it "stands for everything from A to Z in the U.S.A." The same happens in A Woman's Secret (1949), with Susan Caldwell (Gloria Grahame), born and raised in Azusa, describing the town's name as "kind of a made-up name".

Notable people 
 Hank Aguirre, major league baseball pitcher
 Rocky Dennis, born with craniodiaphyseal dysplasia and subject of the motion picture Mask
 Mack Ray Edwards (1918–1971),  Heavy equipment operator, and child sex abuser/serial killer
 Adore Delano, Season 7 American Idol semi-finalist, Season 6 RuPaul's Drag Race finalist, Season 2 RuPaul's Drag Race All Stars contestant, YouTube personality
 Billy Kilmer, NFL quarterback for the San Francisco 49ers, the New Orleans Saints, and the Washington Redskins
 Shinya Kimura, motorcycle builder
 Zack Padilla, world champion boxer
 Anthony Robbins, life coach and author
 Lizette Salas, professional golfer
 Judson Scott, actor
 Greggy Soriano, cake designer and reality TV personality
 Tatiana Suarez (born 1990), mixed martial artist
 Ruth Wysocki, track athlete, 1978 U.S. champion in 800 meters
 Members of Silent Planet, metalcore band
 Scheana Shay, television personality and singer

See also

 Azusa Civic Center

References

External links

 
 Azusa Chamber of Commerce

 
Cities in Los Angeles County, California
Communities in the San Gabriel Valley
Incorporated cities and towns in California
1898 establishments in California
Military Superfund sites
Chicano and Mexican neighborhoods in California